The Canton of Olette is a French former canton of the Pyrénées-Orientales department, in the Languedoc-Roussillon region. It had 1,647 inhabitants (2012). It was disbanded following the French canton reorganisation which came into effect in March 2015.

The canton comprised the following communes:

Olette 
Ayguatébia-Talau
Canaveilles
Escaro
Jujols
Mantet
Nyer
Oreilla
Py
Railleu
Sahorre
Sansa
Serdinya
Souanyas
Thuès-Entre-Valls

References

Olette
2015 disestablishments in France
States and territories disestablished in 2015